The Governor's Lady is a 1912 play.

The Governor's Lady may also refer to:

The Governor's Lady (1915 film)
The Governor's Lady (1923 film)